The AA Highlands District was a high school conference of the Virginia High School League that included schools from Southwest Virginia, mostly in the Bristol and Kingsport areas.  The schools of the Highlands District competed in AA Region IV with the schools in the AA Piedmont District and the AA Southwest District.  The district dissolved in 2007 after two of its members, Lee High School and Virginia High dropped to Group A with the formation of the Clinch Mountain District, which prompted Abingdon High School and Marion High School to move to the Southwest District.

Virginia High School League